The rusty-vented canastero (Asthenes dorbignyi), or creamy-breasted canastero, is a species of bird in the family Furnariidae.

Taxonomy and systematics
The rusty-vented canastero was originally described in the genus Bathmidura (a synonym for Pachyramphus). There are two subspecies of the rusty-vented canastero recognized: consobrina of southwestern Bolivia, and dorbignyi of central Bolivia and northwestern Argentina. Many authorities still consider the dark-winged canastero as a subspecies of the rusty-vented canastero. Also, it is possible that rusty-vented canastero is not a member of the genus Asthenes at all, but instead belongs to the genus Phacellodomus.

Description
The rusty-vented canastero is brown or rufous brown above, usually with a rufous rump, and with pale gray or whitish underparts (throat, breast, and belly). The tail is blackish, but the outer rectrices are rufous, buffy or whitish in color.The rusty-vented canastero is common in most areas within its range, but some subspecies are restricted to small geographic areas and so potentially are vulnerable to habitat loss or degradation.

Distribution and habitat
It is found in the eastern Andes in southeastern Peru, Chile, Bolivia and northwestern Argentina. Its habitat is montane scrub or open Polylepis forest.

References

rusty-vented canastero
Birds of the Puna grassland
rusty-vented canastero
Taxonomy articles created by Polbot
Taxa named by Ludwig Reichenbach